The Toft Lake Village Site, also known by the designation 20NE110, is an archaeological site, once a Late Middle Woodland era village, located on 10 acres on the sandy shore of Toft Lake in Everett Township, Michigan. It was listed on the National Register of Historic Places in 1972.

References

Archaeological sites on the National Register of Historic Places in Michigan
Geography of Newaygo County, Michigan
National Register of Historic Places in Newaygo County, Michigan